Moorfields railway station is an underground railway station in the city centre of Liverpool, England.  The station is situated on both the Northern and Wirral Lines of the Merseyrail network. It is the third-busiest station on the Merseyrail network, and the largest underground station. It is also the only station on the network having services to all other Merseyrail stations.

History 

The station was built in the 1970s, as a replacement for Liverpool Exchange railway station, opening on 2 May 1977. The station was opened by British Rail and is accessed via entrances at Moorfields and on the corner of Old Hall Street and Tithebarn Street. The Old Hall Street entrance is open from only 5:30 am until 7 pm on weekdays.

Services from the north had previously terminated at nearby Liverpool Exchange terminus station. The newly created north–south crossrail Northern Line runs through Moorfields. Liverpool Exchange was closed and the line extended underground to the new Moorfields station. The line from the north continued through a new tunnel to Liverpool Central, continuing south to terminate at Garston.  The line was later extended to Hunts Cross and opened in 1983. At the same time, another new tunnel was built, carrying the Wirral Line in a loop from James Street via Moorfields, Lime Street, and Liverpool Central before returning to James Street; the Wirral Line platform opened on 30 October 1977.

There are three platforms (two for the Northern Line and one for the Wirral Line) in two levels of tunnel.  The Wirral Line platform is at a much deeper level to pass under the Queensway road tunnel.

Passengers must, curiously for an underground station, go up an escalator from the Moorfields entrance to reach the ticket office – the station was originally intended to connect with a pedestrian walkway system, designed to separate pedestrians from traffic. Only a small section of the system was constructed in the 1970s and the scheme eventually fell by the wayside. From the ticket office, another escalator leads down to the main pedestrian tunnel which links the Northern and Wirral Line platforms and the Old Hall Street entrance.

The usage of the station Monday to Friday is much greater than the statistics show, since they credit "Liverpool" passengers to Lime Street station, and do not include day or season ticket holders. The station is however significantly quieter at weekends, since it is primarily used by people working in the business quarter and is less convenient for most of the city centre retail areas.

The ashes of Roy Vivian Hughes, the civil engineer who played a major part in the development of the Merseyrail system, are interred behind in a plaque on the wall of the main corridor.

Recent history
The station underwent an extensive refurbishment in 2015/16 as part of a £40 million investment from Network Rail to allow improvement works to take place at Merseyrail's underground stations, with the refurbishment of Moorfields costing £8 million. The refurbishment was completed in three phases, with each of the three platforms closing in turn for the work to be carried out. Additional funding for replacement of the station's escalators meant that the work was extended from the original April 2016 end date to July 2016.

On 21 March 2016, an extensive track renewal programme was announced for the Wirral Line Loop, requiring the closure of the Loop (and, as a result, the station's Wirral Line platform) between 3 January and 18 June 2017 whilst works take place.

Facilities
The station is staffed, 15 minutes before the first train and 15 minutes after the last train, and has platform CCTV. There is an M to Go shop, toilet and live departure and arrival screens, for passenger information. The station additionally has a 32-space cycle rack and secure indoor storage for 32 cycles. The Old Hall entrance has no disabled-access facilities. The Moorfields entrance has lifts but they have narrow entrances with openings of 800 mm.

Services 
Both lines on the Merseyrail network – the Northern Line and the Wirral Line – serve the station.

On the Northern Line, off-peak service level is as follows:
 4 trains per hour to 
 4 trains per hour to 
 4 trains per hour to 
 4 trains per hour continue to  via 

During late evenings, frequencies are reduced to 2 trains per hour on the Kirkby and Ormskirk branches; the Southport and Hunts Cross service retains 4 trains per hour until end of service.

Sunday services reflect the evening service, but the service from Southport to Hunts Cross is also reduced to 2 trains per hour on Sundays during the winter season. Services remain at 4 trains per hour on Sunday during the summer season.

On the Wirral Line, off-peak service level is as follows:
 4 trains per hour to 
 4 trains per hour to 
 4 trains per hour to 
 2 trains per hour to 

There are also extra services between Liverpool Central and Hooton during peak times.

Northern Line services use Platforms 1 and 2 at the station. Trains to Liverpool Central and Hunts Cross use Platform 1; trains to Southport, Ormskirk and Kirkby use Platform 2. All Wirral Line services depart from Platform 3.

See also
List of underground stations of the Merseyrail network

References

External links 

Moorfields
Railway stations in Liverpool
DfT Category D stations
Railway stations opened by British Rail
Railway stations in Great Britain opened in 1977
Railway stations served by Merseyrail
Railway stations located underground in the United Kingdom